Bakhrabad Gas Adarsha Bidhalaya is a co-educational Bangladeshi high school (Grade I-XI) in Comilla about a half kilometre north from Comilla Medical College. It was established in 1995. Admissions are based on an entrance test and a viva-voce (oral examination). The school provides education in Bengali and English medium under the national curriculum. Students are admitted into the institution in years 1, 6, and 9. The school has 1200 students and employs 30 teaching staff and other staff.

History
BGAB was set up in Comilla in 1995 under the control and management of the Ministry of Education. The construction of the main academic building was completed in 1995. Due to an acute shortage of infrastructure, another development project for construction of a new building was taken up in 1995 which was completed in two phases. The school commenced with only one shift (morning).

Campus
The first building and the second building are five stories and eight stories high respectively. The first five floors, excluding the ground floor of both inter-connected buildings are used for academic purposes. The central hall, gymnasium, teachers' lounge, administrative offices are in the ground floor. The library, principal's office, biology lab, video lab, computer lab 1 are located in the first floor. The second floor has physics lab, internet lab, computer labs 2 and 3, and classrooms. The third floor consists of classrooms only. Chemistry lab and other classrooms are in the fourth floor. The fifth floor of the second building is used as living quarters for the principal and other staff. The dormitory for female students is located on this floor. Dormitories for resident male students are on the sixth and seventh floors.

Library
The school has an air-conditioned library with 15,000 volumes. In addition to the material for studies, there is a collection of fiction, non-fiction and periodicals. The library is open during and after academic hours and remains open up to 5:30 p.m. (summer) and 4:30 p.m. (winter).

Administration
The school is under the control of an autonomous board of governors headed by the secretary, Ministry of Education. The secretary of the school is Bakhrabad Gas Distribution Company Limited. The chief of the administration of college is the headmaster while there is vice master in each of the shifts (morning shifts). The headmaster is Md. Sofiqur Rahman.

References

Schools in Comilla District
High schools in Bangladesh
1995 establishments in Bangladesh
Educational institutions established in 1995